Babes is an American sitcom series that aired Thursdays at 8:30 for one season on Fox from September 13, 1990, to May 19, 1991. Reruns were shown Saturdays at 9:30 from July to August 1991. It was created by Gail Parent and Tracey Jackson and executive produced for 20th Century Fox Television by Sandollar Productions, a former production company run by Sandy Gallin and Dolly Parton.

Overview 
The series follows a trio of overweight sisters facing the challenges of work, relationships, popularity, and starting a family. The ladies also shared a small one-bedroom apartment in New York City, which added to the comic friction.

The Gilbert sisters include Darlene (Susan Peretz), the eldest, who was a dog groomer and recently divorced (her husband had an affair with their weight-loss counselor); Charlene (Wendie Jo Sperber), the middle sister, who was a makeup artist for a commercial photographer and was the most active one out of the three; and Marlene (Lesley Boone), the youngest sister, a former toll collector (and later an actress in a pantyhose commercial and a soap opera), who was seen as a dreamer with a naive, yet trusting, personality. Also in the cast was Charlene's boyfriend, Ronnie Underwood (Rick Overton), a restaurant owner. He disappeared at mid-season, as a result putting all three sisters on the dating market. At that time, the girls' landlady, Florence Newman (Nedra Volz), became a regular.

All three also had physical elements in their resume and it was evidenced in most of the episodes whenever something would tick off the sisters. Among the notable examples: Charlene getting blown up in a helium dress, Darlene breaking a hockey stick while attending a New York Rangers game that got her on probation and head-butting Ronnie over who was going to spend the night at the apartment, Marlene waking the sisters up with potato chips after they didn't hear her come in, and the sisters ganging up on a mime after he mocked them.

Cast
 Wendie Jo Sperber as Charlene Gilbert
 Susan Peretz as Darlene Gilbert
 Lesley Boone as Marlene Gilbert
 Rick Overton as Ronnie Underwood
 Nedra Volz as Mrs. Florence Newman

Episodes

International broadcasts
The series also aired in France under the title Jamais Deux Sans Trois (Never Two Without Three). In Israel the show was titled Nashim Gdolot (Big Women).

References

External links 
 
 
 "Wendie Jo Sperber's return to television", a 1990 Entertainment Weekly article about Sperber that discusses her role on the series.

1990 American television series debuts
1991 American television series endings
1990s American sitcoms
Obesity in television
English-language television shows
Fox Broadcasting Company original programming
Television series by 20th Century Fox Television
Television shows set in New York City